

Ab 

 Tony Abbott b. 1930 first elected in 1974 as Liberal member for Mississauga, Ontario.
 Douglas Abbott b. 1899 first elected in 1940 as Liberal member for St. Antoine—Westmount, Quebec.
 Jim Abbott b. 1942 first elected in 1993 as Reform member for Kootenay East, British Columbia.
 John Joseph Caldwell Abbott b. 1821 first elected in 1867 as Liberal-Conservative member for Argenteuil, Quebec.
 Diane Ablonczy b. 1949 first elected in 1993 as Reform member for Calgary North, Alberta.
 Ziad Aboultaif b. 1966 first elected in 2015 as Conservative member for Edmonton Manning, Alberta.

Ac 

 Honoré Achim b. 1881 first elected in 1911 as Conservative member for Labelle, Quebec.

Ad 
 Eve Adams b. 1974 first elected in 2011 as Conservative member for Mississauga—Brampton South, Ontario. 
 Michael Adams b. 1845 first elected in 1891 as Conservative member for Northumberland, New Brunswick.
 Peter Adams b. 1936 first elected in 1993 as Liberal member for Peterborough, Ontario.
 Agar Rodney Adamson b. 1901 first elected in 1940 as Conservative member for York West, Ontario.
 Alan Joseph Adamson b. 1857 first elected in 1904 as Liberal member for Humboldt, Northwest Territories.
 John Hollings Addison b. 1929 first elected in 1962 as Liberal member for York North, Ontario.
 Mark Adler (politician) b. 1963 first elected in 2011 as Conservative member for York Centre, Ontario. 
 Herbert Bealey Adshead b. 1862 first elected in 1926 as Labour Party member for Calgary East, Alberta.

Ag 
 Leona Aglukkaq b. 1967 first elected in 2008 as Conservative member for Nunavut.

Ah 

 Thomas Franklin Ahearn b. 1886 first elected in 1930 as Liberal member for Ottawa (City of), Ontario.

Ai 

 Gordon Harvey Aiken b. 1918 first elected in 1957 as Progressive Conservative member for Parry Sound—Muskoka, Ontario.
 Scott Aitchison first elected in 2019 as Conservative member for Parry Sound—Muskoka, Ontario. 
 James Albert Manning Aikins b. 1851 first elected in 1911 as Conservative member for Brandon, Manitoba.
 Margaret Aitken b. 1908 first elected in 1953 as Progressive Conservative member for York—Humber, Ontario.

Al 

 Hélène Alarie b. 1941 first elected in 1997 as Bloc Québécois member for Louis-Hébert, Quebec.
 Dan Albas b. 1976 first elected in 2011 as Conservative member for Okanagan—Coquihalla, British Columbia. 
 Harold Albrecht b. 1949 first elected in 2006 as Conservative member for Kitchener—Conestoga, Ontario
 Reg Alcock b. 1948 first elected in 1993 as Liberal member for Winnipeg South, Manitoba.
 George Oscar Alcorn b. 1850 first elected in 1900 as Conservative member for Prince Edward, Ontario.
 John Aldag b. 1963 first elected in 2015 as Liberal member for Cloverdale—Langley City, British Columbia.
 Chris Alexander b. 1968 first elected in 2011 as Conservative member for Ajax, Ontario.
 Lincoln Alexander b. 1922 first elected in 1968 as Progressive Conservative member for Hamilton West, Ontario.
 Omar Alghabra b. 1969 first elected in 2006 as Liberal member for Mississauga—Erindale, Ontario
 Duncan Orestes Alguire b. 1853 first elected in 1911 as Conservative member for Stormont, Ontario.
 Shafqat Ali first elected in 2021 as Liberal member for Brampton Centre, Ontario. 
 Douglas Alkenbrack b. 1912 first elected in 1962 as Progressive Conservative member for Prince Edward—Lennox, Ontario.
 George William Allan b. 1860 first elected in 1917 as Unionist member for Winnipeg South, Manitoba.
 Henry William Allan b. 1843 first elected in 1891 as Liberal member for Essex South, Ontario.
 Hugh Allan b. 1865 first elected in 1926 as Liberal member for Oxford North, Ontario.
 Albert Allard b. 1860 first elected in 1910 as Liberal member for Ottawa (City of), Ontario.
 Carole-Marie Allard b. 1949   first elected in 2000 as Liberal member for Laval East, Quebec.
 Eudore Allard b. 1915   first elected in 1972 as Social Credit member for Rimouski, Quebec.
 Maurice Allard b. 1922   first elected in 1958 as Progressive Conservative member for Sherbrooke, Quebec.
 Benjamin Allen b. 1830 first elected in 1882 as Liberal member for Grey North, Ontario.
 Malcolm Allen first elected in 2008 as New Democratic member for Welland, Ontario.
 Mike Allen first elected in 2006 as Conservative member for Tobique—Mactaquac, New Brunswick
 Henry Edgarton Allen b. 1864 first elected in 1908 as Liberal member for Shefford, Quebec.
 Leona Alleslev b. 1968 first elected in 2015 as Liberal member for Aurora—Oak Ridges—Richmond Hill, Ontario.
 David Wright Allison b. 1826 first elected in 1883 as Liberal member for Lennox, Ontario.
 Dean Allison b. 1965   first elected in 2004 as Conservative member for Niagara West—Glanbrook, Ontario.
 William Henry Allison b. 1838 first elected in 1878 as Conservative member for Hants, Nova Scotia.
 Warren Allmand b. 1932  first elected in 1965 as Liberal member for Notre-Dame-de-Grâce, Quebec.
 Benjamin Graydon Allmark b. 1911  first elected in 1958 as Progressive Conservative member for Kingston, Ontario.
 William Johnston Almon b. 1816 first elected in 1872 as Liberal-Conservative member for Halifax, Nova Scotia.
 Vic Althouse b. 1937   first elected in 1980 as New Democratic Party member for Humboldt—Lake Centre, Saskatchewan.

Am 
 Stella Ambler b. 1966 first elected in 2011 as Conservative member for Mississauga South, Ontario. 
 Rona Ambrose b. 1969   first elected in 2004 as Conservative member for Edmonton—Spruce Grove, Alberta.
 Herbert Brown Ames b. 1863 first elected in 1904 as Conservative member for St. Antoine, Quebec.
 Will Amos b. 1974 first elected in 2015 as Liberal member for Pontiac, Quebec.
 Guillaume Amyot b. 1843 first elected in 1881 as Conservative member for Bellechasse, Quebec.

An 
 Anita Anand b. 1967 first elected in 2019 as Liberal member for Oakville, Ontario. 
 Gary Anandasangaree first elected in 2015 as Liberal member for Scarborough—Rouge Park, Ontario.
 Jack Anawak b. 1950   first elected in 1988 as Liberal member for Nunatsiaq, Northwest Territories.
 Rob Anders b. 1972 first elected in 1997 as Reform member for Calgary West, Alberta.
 Alexander James Anderson b. 1863 first elected in 1925 as Conservative member for Toronto—High Park, Ontario.
 David Anderson b. 1937   first elected in 1968 as Liberal member for Esquimalt—Saanich, British Columbia.
 David L. Anderson b. 1957   first elected in 2000 as Canadian Alliance member for Cypress Hills—Grasslands, Saskatchewan.
 Edna Anderson b. 1922   first elected in 1988 as Progressive Conservative member for Simcoe Centre, Ontario.
 Hugh Alan Anderson b. 1933   first elected in 1974 as Liberal member for Comox—Alberni, British Columbia.
 Raymond Elmer Anderson b. 1891   first elected in 1949 as Liberal member for Norfolk, Ontario.
 Robert King Anderson b. 1861 first elected in 1917 as Unionist member for Halton, Ontario.
 William Anderson b. 1905   first elected in 1957 as Progressive Conservative member for Waterloo South, Ontario.
 Bob Andras b. 1921   first elected in 1965 as Liberal member for Port Arthur, Ontario.
 Guy André b. 1959   first elected in 2004 as Bloc Québécois member for Berthier—Maskinongé, Quebec.
 Harvie Andre b. 1940   first elected in 1972 as Progressive Conservative member for Calgary Centre, Alberta.
 William Andres b. 1925   first elected in 1974 as Liberal member for Lincoln, Ontario.
 George William Andrews b. 1869 first elected in 1917 as Liberal member for Winnipeg Centre, Manitoba.
 Scott Andrews first elected in 2008 as Liberal member for Avalon, Newfoundland and Labrador.
 Auguste-Réal Angers b. 1838 first elected in 1880 as Conservative member for Montmorency, Quebec.
 Louis Charles Alphonse Angers b. 1854 first elected in 1896 as Liberal member for Charlevoix, Quebec.
 Timothy Anglin b. 1822 first elected in 1867 as Liberal member for Gloucester, New Brunswick.
 Douglas Anguish b. 1950 first elected in 1980 as New Democratic Party member for The Battlefords—Meadow Lake, Saskatchewan.
 Charlie Angus b. 1962 first elected in 2004 as New Democratic Party member for Timmins—James Bay, Ontario.
 Iain Angus b. 1947 first elected in 1984 as New Democratic Party member for Thunder Bay—Atikokan, Ontario.

Ap 

 Stephen Burpee Appleby b. 1836 first elected in 1874 as Liberal member for Carleton, New Brunswick.
 Edward Applewhaite b. 1898 first elected in 1949 as Liberal member for Skeena, British Columbia.
 Ursula Appolloni b. 1929   first elected in 1974 as Liberal member for York South, Ontario.

Ar 

 Joseph Archambault b. 1879   first elected in 1917 as Laurier Liberal member for Chambly—Verchères, Quebec.
 Joseph Éloi Archambault b. 1861 first elected in 1900 as Liberal member for Berthier, Quebec.
 Louis Archambeault b. 1817 first elected in 1867 as Liberal-Conservative member for L'Assomption, [Quebec.
 Adams George Archibald b. 1814 first elected in 1869 as Liberal-Conservative member for Colchester, Nova Scotia.
 Cyril Archibald b. 1837 first elected in 1872 as Liberal member for Stormont, Ontario.
 Harry Archibald b. 1910  first elected in 1945 as Cooperative Commonwealth Federation member for Skeena, British Columbia.
 Hazen Argue b. 1921   first elected in 1945 as Cooperative Commonwealth Federation member for Wood Mountain, Saskatchewan.
 Ira Eugene Argue b. 1865 first elected in 1917 as Unionist member for Swift Current, Saskatchewan.
 Thomas Arkell b. 1823 first elected in 1878 as Liberal-Conservative member for Elgin East, Ontario.
 Ernest Frederick Armstrong b. 1878 first elected in 1925 as Conservative member for Timiskaming South, Ontario.
 Frederick Thomas Armstrong b. 1907 first elected in 1963 as Liberal member for Shelburne—Yarmouth—Clare, Nova Scotia.
 James Armstrong b. 1830 first elected in 1882 as Liberal member for Middlesex South, Ontario.
 John Alexander Macdonald Armstrong b. 1877 first elected in 1911 as Conservative member for York North, Ontario.
 Joseph Elijah Armstrong b. 1866 first elected in 1904 as Conservative member for Lambton East, Ontario.
Scott Armstrong b. 1966 first elected in 2009 as Conservative member for Cumberland—Colchester—Musquodoboit Valley, Nova Scotia. 
 Mel Arnold b. 1958 first elected in 2015 as Conservative member for North Okanagan—Shuswap, British Columbia.
 Ian MacLachlan Arrol b. 1924   first elected in 1972 as Progressive Conservative member for York East, Ontario.
 Bona Arsenault b. 1903  first elected in 1945 as Independent member for Bonaventure, Quebec.
 Nérée Arsenault b. 1911  first elected in 1957 as Progressive Conservative member for Bonaventure, Quebec.
 Télésphore Arsenault b. 1872 first elected in 1930 as Conservative member for Kent, New Brunswick.
 Guy Arseneault b. 1952   first elected in 1988 as Liberal member for Restigouche, New Brunswick.
 René Arseneault first elected in 2015 as Liberal member for Madawaska—Restigouche, New Brunswick. 
 André Arthur b. 1943 first elected in 2006 as Independent member for Portneuf—Jacques-Cartier, Quebec.
 James Arthurs b. 1866 first elected in 1908 as Conservative member for Parry Sound, Ontario.
 Chandra Arya b. 1963 first elected in 2015 as Liberal member for Nepean, Ontario.

As 

 Thomas Gordon William Ashbourne b. 1894   first elected in 1949 as Liberal member for Grand Falls—White Bay, Newfoundland and Labrador.
 Patrick Harvey Ashby b. 1890  first elected in 1945 as Social Credit member for Edmonton East, Alberta.
 Keith Ashfield b. 1952 first elected in 2008 as Conservative member for Fredericton, New Brunswick. 
 Niki Ashton b. 1982 first elected in 2008 as New Democratic member for Churchill, Manitoba.
 Jay Aspin b. 1949 first elected in 2011 as Conservative member for Nipissing—Timiskaming, Ontario. 
 Mark Assad b. 1940  first elected in 1988 as Liberal member for Gatineau—La Lièvre, Quebec.
 Sarkis Assadourian b. 1948  first elected in 1993 as Liberal member for Don Valley North, Ontario.
 Edmund Tobin Asselin b. 1920  first elected in 1962 as Liberal member for Notre-Dame-de-Grâce, Quebec.
 Gérard Asselin b. 1950   first elected in 1993 as Bloc Québécois member for Charlevoix, Quebec.
 Patrick Tobin Asselin b. 1930   first elected in 1963 as Liberal member for Richmond—Wolfe, Quebec.
 Martial Asselin b. 1924   first elected in 1958 as Progressive Conservative member for Charlevoix, Quebec.

At 

 Alex Atamanenko b. 1945  first elected in 2006 as New Democratic Party member for British Columbia Southern Interior
 Ron Atkey b. 1942   first elected in 1972 as Progressive Conservative member for St. Paul's, Ontario.
 Ken Atkinson b. 1947  first elected in 1988 as Progressive Conservative member for St. Catharines, Ontario.
 Bill Attewell b. 1932   first elected in 1984 as Progressive Conservative member for Don Valley East, Ontario.
 Jenica Atwin first elected in 2019 as Green member for Fredericton, New Brunswick.

Au 
 Robert Aubin b. 1960 first elected in 2011 as New Democratic Party member for Trois-Rivières, Quebec. 
 Antoine Audet b. 1846 first elected in 1887 as Conservative member for Shefford, Quebec.
 Louis Mathias Auger b. 1902   first elected in 1926 as Liberal member for Prescott, Ontario.
 Michel Auger b. 1830 first elected in 1882 as Independent Liberal member for Shefford, Quebec.
 Jean Augustine b. 1937   first elected in 1993 as Liberal member for Etobicoke—Lakeshore, Ontario.
 Samuel Ault b. 1814 first elected in 1867 as Liberal-Conservative member for Stormont, Ontario.
 Hector Authier b. 1881   first elected in 1940 as Liberal member for Chapleau, Quebec.

Av 

 Melzar Avery b. 1854 first elected in 1902 as Conservative member for Addington, Ontario.

Ax 

 Chris Axworthy b. 1947 first elected in 1988 as New Democratic Party member for Saskatoon—Clark's Crossing, Saskatchewan.
 Lloyd Axworthy b. 1939 first elected in 1979 as Liberal member for Winnipeg—Fort Garry, Manitoba.

Ay 
 Paulina Ayala b. 1962 first elected in 2011 as New Democratic Party member for Honoré-Mercier. 
 Allen Bristol Aylesworth b. 1854 first elected in 1905 as Liberal member for York North, Ontario.
 Wilbert Ross Aylesworth first elected in 1940 as National Government member for Frontenac—Addington, Ontario.
 Henry Aylmer b. 1843 first elected in 1874 as Liberal member for Richmond—Wolfe, Quebec.
 Ramez Ayoub b. 1966 first elected in 2015 as Liberal member for Thérèse-De Blainville, Quebec.

A